The Troaon Group is a geologic group in France. It preserves fossils dating back to the Devonian period.

See also

 List of fossiliferous stratigraphic units in France

References
 

Geologic groups of Europe
Geologic formations of France
Devonian France